Billings is a surname.

People
Notable people with the surname include:

Alan Billings (born 1942), Church of England priest and South Yorkshire's Police Crime Commissioner
Alexandra Billings (born 1962), American actress
Amanda Billings (born 1986), Canadian figure skater
Andrew Billings (born 1995), American football player
Andrew C. Billings, professor  of Journalism and Creative Media  
Bobby Billings (born 1975), American musician, singer and songwriter
Braddish Billings (1783–1864), early settler in the Ottawa, Canada area
Brook Billings (born 1980), American indoor volleyball player
Bruce Billings (disambiguation)
Charles Billings (disambiguation):
Charles E. Billings (1834–1920), American inventor and manufacturer
Charles L. Billings (1856–1938), American lawyer and politician
Charles W. Billings (1899–1928), American politician and sport shooter
Charles Billings (politician) (1825–1906), Canadian politician in Gloucester Township, Ontario
Dave Billings (born 1953), selector for the Dublin senior football team
Dick Billings (born 1942), professional baseball player
Dwight Billings (1910–1997), American ecologist
Earl Billings (born 1945), American actor
Edmund Billings (1868–1929), Canadian-born American financier, banker, sociologist, philanthropist, and government official
 Edward Coke Billings (1829–1893), United States District Judge
 Edwin Tryon Billings (1824–1893), American portrait painter
Elkanah Billings (1820–1876), Canadian palaeontologist
Eric F. Billings (born 1954), chairman of Arlington Asset Investment
Florence Billings (born 1895), American silent film actress
Franklin S. Billings (1862–1935), American politician
Franklin S. Billings Jr. (1922–2014), US Federal Judge from Woodstock, Vermont
Frederick H. Billings (1823–1890), American lawyer and financier from Woodstock, Vermont
G. M. Billings (1890–1969), American football and baseball player and coach and otolaryngologist
George A. Billings (1870–1934), American actor
Hammatt Billings (1818–1874), born Charles Howland Hammatt Billings, an artist and architect from Boston, Massachusetts
Harold Billings (1931–2017), American librarian, editor and author
Henry Billings (1901–1985), American artist
Henry Billings Brown (1836–1913), US Supreme Court Justice
Henry M. Billings (1806–1862), American politician
Jack Billings (born 1995), Australian rules footballer
James Billings (born 1932), American opera singer and director
Jill Billings (born 1962), American politician
Joel Billings, American computer game designer
John Billings (Australian physician) (1918–2007), Australian neurologist
John Shaw Billings (1838–1913), American librarian and surgeon, first director of the New York Public Library
Joseph Billings (c.1758–1806), English explorer in the Russian service
Joseph Edward Billings (died 1880s), American architect
Josh Billings (1818–1885), the pen name of American humorist Henry Wheeler Shaw
Josh Billings (catcher) (1892–1981), professional baseball player
Judith Billings (born 1943), American judge
Katharine Fowler-Billings (1902–1997), American naturalist and geologist
Lem Billings aka Kirk LeMoyne Billings (1916–1981), lifelong close friend of US President John F. Kennedy
Marland P. Billings (1902–1996), American structural geologist
Mary Billings French (1869–1951), American heiress and daughter of Frederick H. Billings
Mary Charlotte Ward Granniss Webster Billings (1824–1904; pseudonym, "M.C.G."), American writer, activist, evangelist, missionary
Phil Billings (born 1939), Australian amateur golfer
Rhoda Billings (born 1937), American professor of law and former chief justice of the North Carolina Supreme Court
Robert Billings (1949–1986), Canadian poet and editor
Robert William Billings (1812–1874), British architect
Sam Billings (born 1991), English cricketer
Ted Billings (1880–1947), American character actor 
Titus Billings (1793–1866), early member of the Latter Day Saint movement
Warren Billings (1893–1972), American labor leader wrongly convicted of a 1916 bombing in San Francisco
William Billings (1746–1800), early American composer
William Howard Billings (1921–1991), Associate Justice of the Supreme Court of Missouri

Fictional characters
Steve Billings, a fictional detective on The Shield

See also
Justice Billings (disambiguation)
Billing (surname)